Blake Woodruff is an American actor who was born on June 19, 1995.

Career
Woodruff began his acting career playing the role of the crying boy in the 2003 thriller Blind Horizon. Further more, he played Mike Baker in the 2003 film Cheaper by the Dozen. In 2004, he played Danny Pope in Mister Ed. From 2004-2005, he played Noah Newman in 5 episodes of The Young and the Restless. In 2005, he played Jake Martin in Back to You and Me. The same year, he reprised his role as Mike Baker in Cheaper by the Dozen 2. In 2007, he played David in Whisper.

Filmography

Awards

References

External links

21st-century American male actors
American male child actors
American male film actors
Living people
Year of birth missing (living people)